Masna Luka is a village in Bosnia and Herzegovina. According to the 1991 census, the village is located in the municipality of Posušje.

Demographics 
According to the 2013 census, its population was 1, a Croat.

References

Populated places in Posušje